The Zygomalas Museum is a museum in Avlonas, Attica, Greece. It exhibits a collection of applied arts, traditional costumes and objects related to schools.

External links
University of Thessaloniki record
Ministry of Culture (in Greek) Brief description of history and activities of museum.
 "Although a large part of these museums are financially supported by the Ministry, they are almost in their entirety owned and run by local authorities or private organisations (e.g. foundations, cultural associations); only four of them are considered as state museums, namely the Museum of Greek Folk Art, the Anogiannakis Museum of Greek Musical Instruments, the Folk Art and Ethnology Museum of Macedonia and Thrace and the Zygomala Museum."

Folk art museums and galleries in Greece
Museums in Attica